Isetemkheb (Asetemakhbit) is the name of several noble and royal women from Ancient Egypt.

 Isetemkheb A, Chief of the Harem of Amun-Re, Wife of Pinedjem I (21st Dynasty)
 Isetemkheb B, Chief of the Harem of Min, possibly the daughter of Masaharta (21st Dynasty)
 Isetemkheb C, First Chief of the Harem of Amun-Re, Wife of Menkheperre and daughter of Psusennes I and Wiay. (21st Dynasty)
 Isetemkheb D, Chief of the Harem of Amun-Re, daughter of Menkheperre and sister-wife of Pinedjem II. (21st Dynasty)
 Isetemkheb E, daughter of Henuttawy C. (21st Dynasty)
 Isetemkheb G, Wife of Osorkon II (22nd Dynasty)
 Isetemkheb H, Great Royal Wife, King's Sister, King's Daughter. Daughter of Shabaka and likely wife of Tanutamun. (25th Dynasty)
 Isetemkheb Q, Mother of Tjanefer (21st Dynasty)
 Isetemkheb R, King's Daughter. Daughter of Necho II. (26th Dynasty)

Ancient Egyptian given names
Theophoric names